Cabragh is a townland in County Tyrone, Northern Ireland. It is situated in the historic barony of Dungannon Lower and the civil parish of Killeeshil and covers an area of 347 acres. Cabragh is located approximately 12 km
west of Dungannon, close to Aghaginduff.

Education 
Cabragh has a primary school called St. Mary's Primary School. Around 200 pupils attend the school as of 2023

See also 
List of townlands of County Tyrone

References 

Townlands of County Tyrone
Civil parish of Killeeshil